1991 Soviet Second League, Zone West was the last season of association football competition of the Soviet Second League in the Zone West. The competition was won by FC Karpaty Lviv.

The group (zone) consisted predominantly out of Ukrainian clubs. With fall of the Soviet Union and discontinuation of Soviet competition, most clubs of the group joined their top national leagues. Because of the First Nagorno-Karabakh War (Operation Ring), many clubs refused to travel to Azerbaijan and were awarded technical losses.

Teams

Promoted teams

Zone 1 (Ukraine)
Torpedo Zaporizhzhia – Winner of the Lower Second League (Returning after a season)
Sudnostroitel Nikoplayev – Runner-up of the Lower Second League (Returning after a season)

Zone 3 (Azerbaijan)
Karabakh Agdam – Winner of the Lower Second League (Returning after a season)

Zone 4
Torpedo Taganrog – Winner of the Lower Second League (Returning after a season)

Zone 5
Tigina-Apoel Bendery – Runner-up of the Lower Second League (Returning after a season)

Zone 6
KIM Vitebsk – Runner-up of the Lower Second League (Returning after a season)

Transferred team from other zones
 Azerbaijani teams that in 1990 competed in Zone "Center" of the Second League moved to Zone "West", while Armenian teams were moved to their place.

Renamed teams 
Prior to the start of the season Kapaz Gandzha was renamed to Dinamo Gandzha.
Prior to the start of the season Tigina Bendery was renamed to Tigina-Apoel Bendery.

Final standings

Representation by republic 

 : 11
 : 4
  2
  2
  3

Top goalscorers
The following were the top ten goalscorers.

External links
 Second League at rsssf.com
 1991 Second League, West at the Luhansk football portal

West Zone
1991 in Russian football leagues
3
1991 in Azerbaijani sport
1991 in Belarusian football
1991–92 in Moldovan football
1990–91 in Moldovan football
1 
1